Manic Karts is a video game developed by British studio Manic Media Productions and published by Virgin Interactive for DOS in 1995.

Gameplay
Manic Karts is a game in which players use their earnings from winning league races to improve their carts.

Reception
Next Generation reviewed the PC version of the game, rating it one star out of five, and stated that "it's strange to come across a racing title that so obviously can't compare [...] a real clunker. Avoid it at all costs."

Reviews
PC Gamer (1996 August)
Computer Gaming World #150 (Jan 1997)
PC Games - Mar, 1996
Pelit - Apr, 1996
PC Player (Germany) - Mar, 1996
GameSpot - Nov 07, 1996

References

1995 video games
DOS games
DOS-only games
Kart racing video games
Video games developed in the United Kingdom